Ángel de la guarda, mi dulce compañía, was a Colombian telenovela produced by RTI for Caracol Televisión and Telemundo.

Cast 
 Manuela González as Carolina Falla
 Diego Ramos as Miguel Ángel Cruz 
 Carlos Ponce as Gustavo Almansa
 Orlando Miguel as Fernando Azula
 Marcela Angarita as Alejandra Valencia
 Juan Carlos Vargas as John Jairo
 Rosemary Bohórquez as Nora "Norita" 
 Enrique Carriazo as Benigno Perales
 Natasha Díaz as Yolanda 
 Mario Duarte as Rafael 
 Hugo Gómez as Antonio Falla
 Sebastián Martínez as John F. Kennedy "Kenny" Perales 
 Ana Bolena Meza as Mariela de Perales
 Jorge Arturo Pérez as Brocoli
 Sandra Pérez as Luisa Falla
 Eliana Piñeros as Manuela
 Juan Pablo Barragán as Ricardo
 Sebastian Peterson as Arturo
 Ana María Trujillo as Diana
 Flor Trujillo
 Ginna Acuña

External links 
 Ángel de la guarda mi dulce compañía en Colarte
 Todotnv
 Diario digital RD

Telemundo telenovelas
2005 telenovelas
Caracol Televisión telenovelas
Colombian telenovelas
2004 Colombian television series debuts
2003 Colombian television series endings
Spanish-language telenovelas
Television shows set in Bogotá